The Albanian List (Albanska lista, AL) is a conservative Albanian minority political alliance in Montenegro, composed of the Albanian Alternative of Nik Gjeloshaj and FORCA of Nazif Cungu. The alliance is currently represented with one seat in the national parliament, being MP Genci Nimanbegu, member of FORCA.

History
The alliance was formed by New Democratic Force (Forca) and the Albanian Alternative (AA), and is also supported by the minor Albanian Coalition "Perspective" and the Democratic League of Albanians (DSA), prior to the 2020 parliamentary election. The Forca and AA, jointly with Democratic Union of Albanians (DUA), had contested the 2016 parliamentary elections as part of "Albanians Decisively", winning a single seat. Incumbent Mayor of Tuzi, Nik Gjeloshaj (AA), headed the coalition electoral list at the parliamentary election in August 2020. The coalition received 1.58% of the vote, winning one seat.

Member parties

See also
Albanians Decisively, the predecessor of this political alliance, active between 2016 and 2020.

References

Political party alliances in Montenegro
Albanian political parties in Montenegro
Conservative parties in Montenegro
Political parties established in 2020